Barb Mucha (born December 1, 1961) is an American professional golfer.

Mucha was born in Parma Heights, Ohio. She played college golf at Michigan State University.

Prior to joining the LPGA Tour in 1987, Mucha won six events on the Futures Tour. Mucha won five LPGA Tour events between 1990 and 1998.

Professional wins

LPGA Tour wins (5)

LPGA Tour playoff record (2–0)

Futures Tour wins (6)
1985 (1) St. George Invitational
1986 (5) Ravines Classic, Turkey Creek Classic, River Edge Classic, Prescott Classic, TECH Futures Classic

Legends Tour wins (1)
2012 Wendy's Charity Challenge

Team appearances
Professional
Handa Cup (representing the United States): 2013, 2014 (winners), 2015 (winners)

References

External links

American female golfers
Michigan State Spartans women's golfers
LPGA Tour golfers
Golfers from Ohio
Golfers from Orlando, Florida
People from Parma Heights, Ohio
Sportspeople from Cuyahoga County, Ohio
1961 births
Living people